Narosodes is a genus of moths in the family Erebidae erected by Frederic Moore in 1887.

Description
Palpi slender, porrect (extending forward) and reaching beyond the frontal tuft. Antennae minutely ciliated (hairy) in the male. Forewing with a slight raised tuft of scales in the cell. Vein 3 to 5 from angle of cell and vein 6 absent. Veins 7 and 8 stalked and veins 9 and 10 free. Hindwings with vein 4 from angle of cell and vein 5 from above the angle. Vein 3 absent, veins 6 and 7 stalked and vein 8 from middle of cell.

Species
 Narosodes fasciata Rothschild, 1913
 Narosodes hampsoni Draudt, 1914
 Narosodes metatroga Hampson, 1918
 Narosodes punctana Walker, 1863
 Narosodes rufocostalis Rothschild, 1912

References

Nudariina
Moth genera